"Under the Influence" is a song by American singer Chris Brown. It is the third track on the extended edition of his ninth studio album Indigo, which was released on October 4, 2019, by RCA Records. The song was written by Brown along with Nigerian singer Davido, producer Kiddominant and Tiffany Mckie. Commercially, "Under the Influence" became a sleeper hit, officially becoming a viral hit in 2022, via TikTok.

Development and composition
"Under the Influence" was written by Chris Brown, Nigerian singer Davido, Nigerian producer KDDO and Tiffany Mckie, and entirely produced by KDDO. The song was included on the expanded edition of Brown's ninth studio album Indigo. Lyrically, in the song Brown expresses his desires while having a passionate sexual encounter, being under the influence of codeine. The song marks the third collaboration between Brown and Davido, following Davido's 2019 single "Blow My Mind", and their duet "Lower Body", also contained on the expanded version of Indigo.

Commercial performance
Following the song going viral and becoming a sleeper hit, "Under the Influence" entered the charts during Summer 2022 in most regions for the first time, including reaching the top ten in Australia, Luxembourg, Greece, Malaysia, New Zealand, South Africa, Philippines, Singapore, Slovakia, Switzerland, and the United Kingdom. It has since received three gold and Platinum Music certifications. A sped-up version, titled "Under the Influence (Body Language)", was also released.

The song debuted at number 36 on the US Billboard Hot 100 on the issue dated September 24, 2022, three years after it was released. As a result, Brown became the first R&B singer in history to have over fifty top-40 hits on the Billboard Hot 100. The song peaked at number 3 on the Billboard Global 200, making it Brown's first top ten on the Global 200 chart since the chart was introduced in 2020.

Charts

Weekly charts

Year-end charts

Certifications

Release history

References

2019 songs
2022 singles
Chris Brown songs
Number-one singles in India
Songs written by Chris Brown
Songs written by Davido
RCA Records singles